The 2019 NBA draft was held on June 20, 2019. It took place at Barclays Center in Brooklyn, New York. National Basketball Association (NBA) teams took turns selecting amateur United States college basketball players and other eligible players, including international players. It was televised nationally on ESPN. State Farm was the presenting sponsor of the NBA draft for the eighth consecutive year. This draft was the first to feature a new weighted lottery system in which the three worst teams each had a 14 percent chance of winning the lottery; these teams were the New York Knicks, Cleveland Cavaliers, and Phoenix Suns. The lottery took place on May 14, during the NBA playoffs. Three of the four teams who held the top four picks of the draft this year rose up from at least six spots in the lottery, including the New Orleans Pelicans, who won the first pick with 6 percent odds.

Draft selections

Draft order and selections adapted from NBA website.

Notable undrafted players

These players were not selected in the 2019 NBA draft, but have played at least one game in the NBA.

Trades involving draft picks

Pre-draft trades
Prior to the day of the draft, the following trades were made and resulted in exchanges of draft picks between the teams below.

Draft-day trades
Draft-day trades were made on June 20, 2019, the day of the draft.

Post-draft trades
The following trades were reportedly agreed prior to and on the day of the draft and were completed at a later date. Due to salary cap reasons, most of these trades were officially announced on July 6, after the NBA moratorium period ended.

Combine

The invitation-only NBA Draft Combine was held in Chicago from May 15 to 19. The on-court element of the combine took place on May 17 and 18. This year, 66 players were originally invited to the combine, including top prospects Zion Williamson and Ja Morant. The pool of participants also included Croatian Luka Šamanić, postgraduate Jalen Lecque, and Darius Bazley, who took a route similar to Mitchell Robinson with not playing in college or another league for a year before entering the draft. A couple of prospects also returned to the event after entering the previous year's combine, include an injury recovering Jontay Porter and Brian Bowen, a player who entered last year as a collegiate participant last year before heading off to play professionally in Australia this year. In addition, this year also introduced the NBA G League Elite Camp, which gave a certain number of draft hopefuls a chance to transfer into the NBA Draft Combine afterward. This year, eleven participants from that event joined the combine, increasing the number of total invites up to 77. One of the additional invites was Tacko Fall, who broke combine records for height (reaching  with shoes on), wingspan, and standing reach.

Draft lottery

The NBA draft lottery took place during the Playoffs on May 14, 2019. This was the first year in which the new NBA draft lottery system is applied, where the draft lottery was expanded to the top four picks (rather than the top three); and where the three teams with the worst records had equal odds. Teams with better records had an increased chance for a top-four pick when compared to the previous system, which was what happened for the New Orleans Pelicans, Memphis Grizzlies, and Los Angeles Lakers this year.

Eligibility and entrants

The draft is conducted under the eligibility rules established in the league's 2017 collective bargaining agreement (CBA) with its player's union. The previous CBA that ended the 2011 lockout instituted no immediate changes to the draft but called for a committee of owners and players to discuss future changes.
 All drafted players must be at least 19 years old during the calendar year of the draft. In terms of dates, players who are eligible for the 2019 draft must be born on or before December 31, 2000.
 Since the 2016 draft, the following rules, as implemented by the NCAA Division I council for that division, are:
 Declaration for the draft no longer results in an automatic loss of college eligibility. As long as a player does not sign a contract with a professional team outside the NBA, or sign with an agent, he will retain college eligibility as long as he makes a timely withdrawal from the draft.
 NCAA players have until 10 days after the end of the NBA Draft Combine to withdraw from the draft. Since the combine is held in mid-May, the current deadline is about five weeks after the previous mid-April deadline.
 NCAA players may participate in the draft combine and are allowed to attend one tryout per year with each NBA team without losing college eligibility.
 NCAA players may enter and withdraw from the draft up to two times without loss of eligibility. Previously, the NCAA treated the second declaration of draft eligibility as a permanent loss of college eligibility.
 Starting this year, any undrafted underclassmen in the college system will have the opportunity to return to their college or university for at least one more season, provided they terminate their prior agreements with the agent they signed up with.
 
The NBA has since expanded the draft combine to include players with remaining college eligibility (who, like players without college eligibility, can only attend by invitation).

Early entrants
Players who are not automatically eligible have to declare their eligibility for the draft by notifying the NBA offices in writing no later than 60 days before the draft. For the 2019 draft, the date fell on April 21. After that date, "early entry" players are able to attend NBA pre-draft camps and individual team workouts to show off their skills and obtain feedback regarding their draft positions. Under the CBA a player may withdraw his name from consideration from the draft at any time before the final declaration date, which is 10 days before the draft. Under current NCAA rules, players had until May 29 (10 days after the draft combine) to withdraw from the draft and retain college eligibility.
 
A player who has hired an agent forfeits his remaining college eligibility when he is drafted. He can be represented beginning after any basketball season, following a request for an evaluation from the NBA Undergraduate Advisory Committee. From this draft on, players who declare for the NBA draft and are not selected have the opportunity to return to their school for at least another year, only after terminating all agreements with their agents.

College underclassmen
This year, 233 underclassed draft prospects (i.e., players with remaining college eligibility) had declared by the April 21 deadline, with 175 of these players being from college (including one American who went to a Canadian college) or were high school postgraduates. The names left over mean they have hired an agent, or have announced that they plan to do so before the night of the draft. At the end of the deadline, 86 players declared their intentions to enter the draft with an agent while 89 announced their return to college for at least one more season. By the end of the international underclassmen deadline, both Sacha Killeya-Jones and Kouat Noi removed their names from this year's draft while removing their collegiate eligibility as well, which left 84 total college underclassmen entering the draft.

  Nickeil Alexander-Walker – G, Virginia Tech (sophomore)
  RJ Barrett – F, Duke (freshman)
  Tyus Battle – G, Syracuse (junior)
 / Bol Bol – C, Oregon (freshman)
  Marques Bolden – C, Duke (junior)
  Jordan Bone – G, Tennessee (junior)
  Ky Bowman – G, Boston College (junior)
  Ignas Brazdeikis – F, Michigan (freshman)
  Oshae Brissett – F, Syracuse (sophomore)
  Armoni Brooks – G, Houston (junior)
  Charlie Brown Jr. – F, Saint Joseph's (sophomore)
  Moses Brown – C, UCLA (freshman)
  Brandon Clarke – F, Gonzaga (junior)
 / Nic Claxton – F, Georgia (sophomore)
  Amir Coffey – G, Minnesota (junior)
  Tyler Cook – F, Iowa (junior)
  Jarrett Culver – G, Texas Tech (sophomore)
  Aubrey Dawkins – G, UCF (junior)
  Luguentz Dort – G, Arizona State (freshman)
  Jason Draggs – F, Lee (freshman)
  Carsen Edwards – G, Purdue (junior)
  Bruno Fernando – F, Maryland (sophomore)
  Daniel Gafford – F, Arkansas (sophomore)
  Darius Garland – G, Vanderbilt (freshman)
  Kyle Guy – G, Virginia (junior)
  Rui Hachimura – F, Gonzaga (junior)
  Jaylen Hands – G, UCLA (sophomore)
  Jared Harper – G, Auburn (junior)
  Jaxson Hayes – F, Texas (freshman)
  Dewan Hernandez – F, Miami (junior)
  Tyler Herro – G, Kentucky (freshman)
  Amir Hinton – G, Shaw (junior)
  Jaylen Hoard – F, Wake Forest (freshman)
  Daulton Hommes – G, Point Loma (junior)
  Talen Horton-Tucker – G, Iowa State (freshman)
  De'Andre Hunter – G, Virginia (sophomore)
  Ty Jerome – G, Virginia (junior)
  Keldon Johnson – G, Kentucky (freshman)
  Mfiondu Kabengele – F, Florida State (sophomore)
  Louis King – F, Oregon (freshman)
  V. J. King – F, Louisville (junior)
  Sagaba Konate – F, West Virginia (junior)
  Martin Krampelj – F, Creighton (junior)
  Romeo Langford – G, Indiana (freshman)
  Cameron Lard – F, Iowa State (sophomore)
  Dedric Lawson – F, Kansas (junior)
  Jalen Lecque – G, Brewster Academy (postgraduate)
  Jacob Ledoux – G, UTPB (junior)
  Nassir Little – F, North Carolina (freshman)
  Trevor Manuel – G/F, Olivet (junior)
  Charles Matthews – G, Michigan (junior)
  Jalen McDaniels – F, San Diego State (sophomore)
  Ja Morant – G, Murray State (sophomore)
  Zach Norvell Jr. – G, Gonzaga (sophomore)
  Jaylen Nowell – G, Washington (sophomore)
  Chuma Okeke – F, Auburn (sophomore)
  KZ Okpala – F, Stanford (sophomore)
  Miye Oni – G, Yale (junior)
  Lamar Peters – G, Mississippi State (junior)
  Shamorie Ponds – G, St. John's (junior)
  Jordan Poole – G, Michigan (sophomore)
  Jontay Porter – C, Missouri (sophomore)
  Kevin Porter Jr. – G, USC (freshman)
  Brandon Randolph – F, Arizona (sophomore)
  Cam Reddish – G, Duke (freshman)
  Isaiah Reese – G, Canisius (junior)
  Naz Reid – F, LSU (freshman)
  Austin Robinson – G, Kentucky Christian (sophomore)
  Isaiah Roby – F, Nebraska (junior)
  Ayinde Russell – G, Morehouse (junior)
 / Samir Šehić – F, Tulane (junior)
  Simisola Shittu – F, Vanderbilt (freshman)
  Justin Simon – G, St. John's (junior)
  D'Marcus Simonds – G, Georgia State (junior)
  Jalen Sykes – F, St. Clair (Canada; junior)
  Rayjon Tucker – G, Little Rock (junior)
  Nick Ward – F, Michigan State (junior)
  P. J. Washington – F, Kentucky (sophomore)
 / Tremont Waters – G, LSU (sophomore)
  Coby White – G, North Carolina (freshman)
  Lindell Wigginton – G, Iowa State (sophomore)
  Kris Wilkes – G, UCLA (sophomore)
  Grant Williams – F, Tennessee (junior)
  Zion Williamson – F, Duke (freshman)
  Kenny Wooten – F, Oregon (sophomore)

International players
International players that had declared this year and did not previously declare in another prior year can drop out of the draft about 10 days before the draft begins on June 10. By the April 23 deadline, a record-high 58 international prospects, including an international Canadian university player, expressed interest in the 2019 NBA draft. By the end of the international deadline on June 10, 46 of these players pulled their names out of the draft, leaving only 12 fully foreign players entering the NBA draft this year. For this year's draft, the total underclassmen left were 96 players.

  Goga Bitadze – C, Mega Bemax (Serbia)
  Yago dos Santos – G, Paulistano Corpore (Brazil)
  Sekou Doumbouya – F, Limoges CSP (France)
  Matas Jogėla – G, Dzūkija Alytus (Lithuania)
  Didi Louzada – F, Sesi/Franca (Brazil)
  William McDowell-White – G, Brose Bamberg (Germany)
  Adam Mokoka – G, Mega Bemax (Serbia)
  Joshua Obiesie – G, s.Oliver Würzburg (Germany)
  David Okeke – F, Fiat Torino (Italy)
  Luka Šamanić – F, Petrol Olimpija (Slovenia)
  Deividas Sirvydis – G, Rytas Vilnius (Lithuania)
  Yovel Zoosman – G, Maccabi Tel Aviv (Israel)

Automatically eligible entrants
Players who do not meet the criteria for "international" players are automatically eligible if they meet any of the following criteria:
 They have completed four years of their college eligibility.
 If they graduated from high school in the U.S., but did not enroll in a U.S. college or university, four years have passed since their high school class graduated.
 They have signed a contract with a professional basketball team not in the NBA, anywhere in the world, and have played under that contract.
 
Players who meet the criteria for "international" players are automatically eligible if they meet any of the following criteria:
 They are at least 22 years old during the calendar year of the draft. In terms of dates, players born on or before December 31, 1997 are automatically eligible for the 2019 draft.
 They have signed a contract with a professional basketball team not in the NBA within the United States, and have played under that contract.

Invited attendees
The NBA annually invites around 15–20 players to sit in the so-called "green room", a special room set aside at the draft site for the invited players plus their families and agents. When his name is called, the player leaves the room and goes up on stage. Other players who are not invited are allowed to attend the ceremony. They sit in the stands with the fans and walk up the stage when or if they are drafted. On June 8, the NBA announced only 9 invited players to the event (all of whom played collegiately this year). Four days later, the NBA invited seven more players to the event, bringing the number of invites up to 16. Two more players were invited the next day, bumping the number up to 18. On June 14, two more players were invited to this year's event, bringing up the total invites to 20. Five days later, three more players received last minute invitations for this year's NBA draft, bringing the total number of invites up to 23. On the night of the event, Matisse Thybulle was revealed as a last-minute invite, bumping up the final invite list to 24. The following players (listed alphabetically) were confirmed as invites for the event:
 

 Nickeil Alexander-Walker, Virginia Tech (not on the original list, later invited)
 RJ Barrett, Duke
 Goga Bitadze, Mega Bemax (Serbia) (not on the original list, later invited)
/ Bol Bol, Oregon (not on the original list, later invited)
 Brandon Clarke, Gonzaga (not on the original list, later invited)
/ Nic Claxton, Georgia (not on the original list, later invited)
 Jarrett Culver, Texas Tech
/ Sekou Doumbouya, Limoges CSP (France) (not on the original list, later invited)
 Darius Garland, Vanderbilt
 Rui Hachimura, Gonzaga (not on the original list, later invited)
 Jaxson Hayes, Texas
 Tyler Herro, Kentucky (not on the original list, later invited)
 De'Andre Hunter, Virginia
 Keldon Johnson, Kentucky (not on the original list, later invited)
 Mfiondu Kabengele, Florida State (not on the original list, later invited)
 Romeo Langford, Indiana (not on the original list, later invited)
 Nassir Little, North Carolina (not on the original list, later invited)
 Ja Morant, Murray State
 Kevin Porter Jr., USC (not on the original list, later invited)
 Cam Reddish, Duke
 Matisse Thybulle, Washington (not on the original list, later invited)
 P. J. Washington, Kentucky (not on the original list, later invited)
 Coby White, North Carolina
 Zion Williamson, Duke

Notes

See also
 List of first overall NBA draft picks

References

External links
 
 

Draft
National Basketball Association draft
NBA Draft
NBA draft
2010s in Brooklyn
Basketball in New York City
Prospect Heights, Brooklyn
Sports in Brooklyn
Sporting events in New York City
Events in Brooklyn, New York